Model Arab League, also known as MAL, is a multi-regional model competition in which high school and university students from across the world learn about and compete as representatives from Member States of the Arab League.  Participants are encouraged to use the experience to hone their skills in public speaking and diplomacy, in addition to the primary goal of learning about the politics and history of the Arab world.  In the United States, the competitions are administered by The National Council on U.S.-Arab Relations (NCUSAR).  Outside the United States, the University of Peloponnese hosts the Corinth Model Arab League and the American University in Cairo hosts the Cairo International Model Arab League (CIMAL).

Structure 

Model Arab League is a debate simulation of the Arab League. This format is similar to Model United Nations which challenges students to accurately represent the needs and interests of United Nations member countries. One of the biggest differences in structure between Model UN and Model Arab League is that the latter is made up of only 22 member countries in contrast to Model UN's 193. This difference in size allows for more focused and in-depth debating, but with a purview restricted to the Arab world. 

Model Arab League is administered centrally from Washington, DC by the National Council on U.S.-Arab Relations which works with local hosts to coordinate and run conferences across the United States. The National Council also updates debate topics and research guides yearly by utilizing nationally appointed student leaders who also act as secretariat for the National University Conference.

Conference Administration 
MAL conferences are primarily run by regional coordinators, who are supported by a team of MAL students. The regional host is responsible for conducting outreach, recruiting new participants, scheduling conference space, and staffing the conference. Additional oversight is provided by a National Council representative who travels to each conference to provide assistance in regards to interacting with students, ensuring standardization across conferences, and being the final say when enforcing parliamentary procedure.

The rest of the conference is led by pre-selected student leaders divided into upper and lower secretariat, and headed by a Secretary General (SG). The SG reviews draft resolutions created in council and checks for proper formatting and accurate policy simulation. SGs also enforce parliamentary procedure when necessary and are often supported by an Assistant Secretary General (ASG) and Chief of Staff (COS). The Upper Secretariat will include additional positions for larger conferences, such as ASG-2, and ASG of Information.

The Lower Secretariat consists of Council Chairman who moderate debate in each council. These positions are usually filled several months ahead of time at the discretion of the local host and National Council representative. Chairs are supported by a Vice-Chair, Rapporteur, and Parliamentarian, all of whom are voted on by members of each council. Vice-Chairs support the Chair in reviewing resolutions, and will often chair for short periods to gain additional experience. Vice-Chairs regularly become full Council Chairs at the next regional conference. Lastly, Rapporteurs maintain lists of countries wishing to be heard in debate, while Parliamentarians may be called on at any time to clarify parliamentary procedure.

Conferences

Model Arab League Conferences fall into three categories:  College, High School and International.   In the United States, the college competitions consist of a series of regional conferences and as well as several National conferences held in Washington, DC.  As of 2020, the College regional and national conferences include:

 Appalachia Regional

 Bilateral Chamber (Houston) Regional
 Capital Area Regional 
 Florida Regional
 Great Plains Regional
 Michigan Regional
 National University Conference
 Northeast Regional
 Northern California Regional
 Northern Rockies Regional
 Ohio Valley Regional
 Rocky Mountain Regional
 Southeast Regional
 Southern California Regional
 Southwest Regional
 Upper Midwest Regional

The Southeast and the Northeast conferences are both the oldest and largest regional conferences and draw in several hundred participants every year.

Councils and Topics 

Model Arab League conferences are divided into councils that each focus on a specific area of Arab League policy.  Although the councils offered by international conferences such as the Cairo International MAL tend to fluctuate, the National Council on U.S.-Arab Relations (NCUSAR) assures that most simulations within the US share common councils and structure from year to year.

The NCUSAR-sponsored council list consists of eight councils, though not all of the councils are simulated at all models.

Joint Defense Council (JDC)
The Joint Defense Council primarily deals with matters of collective security within the Arab League.  The JDC operates under the guidelines of the Treaty of Joint Defense and Economic Cooperation Between the States of the Arab League, June 17, 1950
Council on Palestinian Affairs
The Council on Palestinian Affairs is charged with evaluating and responding to the plethora of issues involving the Palestinian people and their interaction with their neighbors.  As Palestine is a fully recognized Member State of the Arab League, the representative from Palestine has considerable influence in this council.
Council of Arab Social Affairs Ministers
This council deals primarily with social matters relating to the Arab world, such as human rights, refugees, etc.
Council on Political Affairs
The Council on Political Affairs focuses on matters related to political interactions between Member States of the Arab League and between the Arab League or certain Member States and states outside of the Arab League.
Council of Arab Environmental Affairs Ministers
This council is concerned with environmental conditions within and related to Member States of the Arab League.  Issues such as water rights, agricultural chemicals, and long-term environmental sustainability are often discussed in this council.
Council of Arab Economics Affairs Ministers
The Council of Arab Economics Affairs Ministers focuses its efforts on ensuring the economic success of the Arab world.  This council has historically focused on topics such as long-term economic stability, diversification away from primarily oil-based economies, and ensuring adequate employment opportunities for persons living in the Arab world.
Special Summit of Arab Heads of State
The Special Summit was available in certain regional competitions, as well as the national competition in Washington, D.C., for the 2008 competition. This simulation is unique from the others in that instead of simply role-playing a diplomat from a Member State, individuals working in this Special Summit are actually asked to role-play a Head of state of a specific Arab League Member State.  This leads to a unique experience for everyone involved in the Special Summit as they are the final authority on all policy matters for their respective state, and therefore must be careful of their announced decisions and negotiations in this body as they may impact all of the delegates from the same Member State assigned to the other councils.
Special Council
Special Council is not restricted to any one theme, and rotates every year to a new area of concern not covered by other councils. Previous Special Councils have addressed violence against women and children, post conflict recovery, and religion and extremism.
The Special Council for the 2021-2022 MAL season deals with issues related to Technology and Cyber-security in the MENA region.
Arab Court of Justice (ACJ)
The Arab Court of Justice is an idealized body that does not actually have a counterpart in the Arab League.  The ACJ is simulated at Model Arab League conferences in order to demonstrate the potential effectiveness of such an entity to the Arab League.  The ACJ typically deals with controversial matters within the Arab world and attempts to provide solutions for these problems.  Court cases have historically ranged from refugee and employment disputes to questions of resource allocation and territorial disputes, particularly with regard to Western Sahara.  Much of how the ACJ functions is modeled after the International Court of Justice.

Member States 

*Although Syria has been suspended from the Arab League since 2011, the Syrian National Coalition is given representation and is modeled on the National Coalition for Syrian Revolutionary and Opposition Forces

**Observer states are offered at larger conferences, or if specially requested. Observer states have the same rights as other member states, but are not allowed to vote on resolutions. This puts more pressure on observers to form alliances and encourage member states to vote in accordance with the interests of the observer.

See also
 Arab League
 Model Congress
 Model European Parliament
 Model European Union Strasbourg
 Model United Nations
 National Council on U.S.-Arab Relations

References

External links 
 NCUSAR website
 Model Arab League website

Youth model government